The 15 cm SK L/40 was a German naval gun that was used as secondary armament on pre-dreadnought battleships, protected cruisers and armored cruisers of the Imperial German Navy in World War I.  It was also used as a coast-defence gun during World Wars I and II.

Construction
The 15 cm SK L/40 gun was constructed of A tube, two layers of hoops and used a Krupp horizontal sliding-wedge breech block.  It used separate loading metallic cased propellant charges and projectiles. Unlike other large naval guns of the time which used separate loading bagged charges and projectiles, this gun used charges inside of a brass cartridge case to provide obturation.  The guns were often mounted in single casemates or single turrets amidships.  In addition to guns produced for the Imperial German Navy comparable export models were produced for the Royal Netherlands Navy and produced under license by Škoda for the Austro-Hungarian Navy.

Naval Use 
Ship classes that carried the 15 cm SK L/40 include:

China:
Haiyung class protected cruiser

Ammunition
Ammunition was of separate loading quick fire type.

The gun was able to fire:
 Armor Piercing 
 High Explosive Base Fuzed 
 High Explosive Nose Fuzed 
 Common Shell Nose Fuzed

See also 

 List of naval guns
 Battery Lothringen
 15 cm L/40 Feldkanone i.R.
 15 cm K (E)
 QF 6 inch /40 naval gun British equivalent, firing slightly heavier shell
 6"/40 caliber gun US equivalent, firing slightly heavier shell

Notes

Citations

References

External links
 15 cm SK L/40 at Navweaps.com

150 mm artillery
Naval guns of Germany
World War I naval weapons
World War I artillery of Germany
World War II artillery of Germany
Coastal artillery